Air Rage is a 2001 American action film directed by Fred Olen Ray (credited as Ed Raymond) and starring Ice-T and Cyril O'Reilly.

Plot
Colonel John Sykes orders his men to massacre a village they were sent to rescue some hostages, but decide to get some payback when they find them dead. Sykes returns to the US only to be court-martialed and is forced to make a plea agreement when he gets all the blame and his men are discharged and they receive benefits that they're entitled to. However, General Harlan Prescott, who is presiding over the trial, chooses not to agree to the terms and throws the book at Sykes, where Sykes and his men are dishonorably discharged, thus eliminating all their benefits. While Sykes is being transported, he's rescued by his men. Sometime later, Prescott has been appointed to an important government position and he boards a plane to go on his latest assignment. Sykes and his men are also on the plane and take control the plane. When the tower learns of the deviation, a government man arrives and upon learning of Sykes' presence on the plane sends a team to board the plane while in flight. After they're all massacred by Sykes and his men, the sole survivor has to stop Sykes and his only help is the flight attendant.

Cast
 Ice-T as Matt Marshall
 Cyril O'Reilly as Colonel John Sykes
 Kimberly Oja as Kelly Young
 Steve Hytner as Morton
 Gil Gerard as Victor Quinn
 Alex Cord as General Harlan Prescott
 Glynn Turman as Ted Bigelow
 Mary Elizabeth McGlynn as Gwen
 Chick Vennera as Fishman
 WC as Ferris
 Jack McGee as John Simpson

External links
 

2001 films
American action films
Films directed by Fred Olen Ray
2000s English-language films
2000s American films